John Brendan Keane (21 July 1928 – 30 May 2002) was an Irish playwright, novelist and essayist from Listowel, County Kerry.

Biography

A son of a national school teacher, William B. Keane, and his wife Hannah (née Purtill), Keane was educated at Listowel National School and then at St Michael's College, Listowel. He worked as a chemist's assistant for A. H. Jones who dabbled in buying antiques. Keane had various jobs in the UK between 1951 and 1955 working as a street cleaner, and a bar man, living in a variety of places including Northampton and London. It was while he was in Northampton that Keane was first published in an unnamed women's magazine for which he received £15.

After returning to Ireland from the United Kingdom, he became a pub owner in Listowel from 1955.

He married Mary O'Connor at Knocknagoshel Church on 5 January 1955 and had four children: Billy, Conor, John and Joanna. 

He was an Honorary Life Member of the Royal Dublin Society from 1991, served as president of Irish PEN and was a founder member of the Society of Irish Playwrights as well as a member of Aosdána. Keane was named the patron of the Listowel Players after the Listowel Drama Group fractured. He remained a prominent member of the Fine Gael party throughout his life, never being shy of political debate.

His nephew is the investigative journalist Fergal Keane. His son John is a journalist with the Kilkenny People while his son, Billy regularly writes a column for the Irish Independent.

Influences 
Keane cited many literary influences including Bryan MacMahon and George Fitzmaurice, fellow Kerry writers and playwrights.

His personal influences were numerous but, most notably he thanked his father and his wife, Mary. Keane was grateful for his father's help with early editing and for allowing him access to his personal library, and encouraging him to continue his work until he was successful.

He was also influenced by the local population and the patrons of his pub, on whom he based some of his characters.

Awards and honours
1999 Irish PEN Award

List of works
 Many Young Men of Twenty (1946)
 Sive (1959)
 Sharon's Grave (1960)
 The Highest House on the Mountain (1961)
 The Man From Clare (1962)
 The Year of the Hiker (1963)
 The Field (1965)
 Hut 42 (1968)
 The Rain at the End of the Summer (1968)
 Big Maggie (1969)
 Moll (1971)
 The One-Way Ticket (1972)
 Values (1973)
The Crazy Wall (1973)
 The Change in Mame Fadden (1973)
 Letters of a Matchmaker (1975)
 Letters of a Country Postman (1977)
 The Buds of Ballybunion (1979)
 The Chastitute (1981)
 Man of the Triple Name (1984)
 Owl Sandwiches (1985) 
 The Bodhran Makers (1986)
 The Contractors (1988)
 The Ram of God and Other Stories (1992)
 Durango: A Novel (1992)
 Faoiseamh
 Pishogue
 No More in Dust

References

External links
Official Homepage
Irish Writers Online: John B Keane
Play Information
About the Matchmaker
BBC Report of his death
RTE Report of his death

1928 births
2002 deaths
Deaths from cancer in the Republic of Ireland
Deaths from prostate cancer
Drinking establishment owners
Irish essayists
Irish male dramatists and playwrights
Irish male novelists
Irish PEN Award for Literature winners
Male essayists
People educated at St Michael's College, Listowel
People from Listowel
20th-century Irish dramatists and playwrights
20th-century essayists
20th-century Irish male writers
20th-century Irish novelists